A fiber is a long strand of material.

Fiber or Fibre may also refer to:

Arts, entertainment, and media
 Fiber (album), a 2016 album by Dead Register

Healthcare
 Dietary fiber
 Myofiber, or muscle fiber, strands of muscle tissue
 Nerve fiber, strands of nervous tissue

Mathematics and technology
 Fiber (computer science)
 Fiber (mathematics)
 Fiber laser (or fibre laser), a laser in which the active gain medium is an optical fiber doped with rare-earth elements
 Fiber-optic communication
 Google Fiber, part of the Access division of Alphabet Inc.; provides fiber-to-the-premises service (i.e., broadband Internet and IPTV) in the United States
 Optical fiber

Other uses
 Fiber crop, three main groups: cordage fiber (used in production of rope), filling fiber (used to stuff upholstery), and textile fiber (used in production of cloth)
 Natural fiber
 Synthetic fiber